Zia ur Rahman Barq is an Indian politician and  Member of the 18th Uttar Pradesh Assembly since 10 March 2022 from Kundarki (Moradabad district) as Samajwadi Party candidate. He is the son of Mamluk Ur Rahman Barq and the grandson of Shafiqur Rahman Barq, who is the Member of Parliament (MP) from Sambhal.

Political career 
Before 2017 Uttar Pradesh Legislative Assembly election, he  was member of  All India Majlis-e-Ittehadul Muslimeen.

Controversies 
Ziaur Rahman's father Mamlook Ur Rahman congratulated the Taliban over their controversy in the 2021 Taliban offensive. A complaint was filed over Ziaur for breaking  the election rules. Zia Ur Rahman Barq raised the demand to start Islamic studies in BHU after the controversies in AMU to teach Sanatan Dharma.

References 

Living people
Year of birth missing (living people)
Indian politicians
Uttar Pradesh MLAs 2022–2027